Phuture 303 was an acid house music group founded in 1996 by DJ Spank Spank. Its members included Roy Davis Jr., Damon Neloms (a.k.a. Professor Trax), L.A. Williams, Ron Maney a.k.a. DJ Skull and Rio "The Musician" Lee. 

Phuture 303 released several singles and two full-length albums "Alpha & Omega" in 1996 and "Survival's Our Mission" in 2001.

In 2014, Pierre and Smith reunited as PHUTURE with Lee.,

Members 
 Spanky, a.k.a. DJ Spank-Spank, (Earl Smith Jr.)
 DJ Skull (Ron Maney) 
 Roy Davis Jr. 
 L.A. Williams 
 Lothario "Rio" Lee* Roy Davis Jr. 
 Damon Neloms a.k.a. Professor Trax

Discography

Singles and maxi-singles 
 Acid Soul (1997)
 Phreedom! (1997)
 Hardfloor Will Survive (Hardfloor vs. Phuture 303) (1998)
 Thunder Part One (2000)
 Thunder Part Two (2000)
 Soulgers Of Tekkno (2000)

Albums 
 Alpha & Omega (1996)
 Survival's Our Mission (2001)

Remixes 
 DJ Pierre: Matrix Chamber (Phuture 303 Deep Underground Mix) (1999)
 Zzino vs. Filterheadz: No Weapons (Phuture 303 Remix) (2002)

References

External links 
 

Acid house groups
American house music groups
Electronic music groups from Illinois